WMXL  (94.5 MHz) is a commercial FM radio station licensed to Lexington, Kentucky. The station is owned by iHeartMedia, Inc., who determines its programming in New York using automation, non-local talent, and airs an adult contemporary radio format, switching to Christmas music for much of November and December.

That gives it a nearly 90-mile broadcasting radius. Its signal is heard as far south as London, as far east as Morehead, as far north as Cincinnati and as far west as Louisville. The transmitter is on Russell Cave Road near Huffman Mill Pike in Lexington, amid the towers for other FM and TV stations. WMXL-FM was the fifth station in the Lexington radio market to begin broadcasting using HD Radio technology, after WUKY, WKQQ, WBUL-FM, and WLKT. The HD-2 digital subchannel plays country music.

History

WLAP-FM
In , the station signed on as WLAP-FM.  It was the FM counterpart to WLAP 630 AM.  The two stations mostly simulcast WLAP's programming.  In the 1940s and 50s, WLAP-AM-FM were CBS Radio Network affiliates.  They carried the line up of CBS dramas, comedies, news, sports, soap operas, game shows and big band broadcasts during the "Golden Age of Radio."  In the 1960s, the two stations played contemporary hits.

In 1974, the simulcast ended.  The AM station moved to a full service, adult contemporary sound, while WLAP-FM remained as at Top 40 outlet.  The station was automated, without disc jockeys.  It used TM's Stereo Rock format as "The New WLAP 94 And A 1/2, The Music FM" for many years.  After transitioning to live programming in 1987, saw its peak of popularity in the late 1980s and early 1990s, shifting to a more rhythmic contemporary or "Churban" direction.  At that time, the station was known as "The New Power 94 And A 1/2, WLAP-FM". It was programmed by Lexington native Gregory "Barry Fox" Peddicord. In 1991, Dale O'Brian was named Program Director.

Mix 94.5
On April 1, 1992, O'Brian oversaw a shift to Hot Adult Contemporary music and the name Mix 94.5.  The station switched its call sign to WMXL to reflect its "Mix" name.

Dale O'Brian served as morning show host and program director for much of the early 1990s and was named Billboard Magazine's "Personality of the Year" in 1996. O'Brian left for the programming position at Z104 in Washington, DC in July 1996. At that point, Rick O'Shea arrived to guide the morning show, and Doug Hamand was given control of the programming. The O'Shea version of the station's Breakfast Club also featured local radio legend Matt Jaeger and former Miss Kentucky Kristie Hicks.

Other popular Mix 94.5 air talent during this period included Barry Fox and longtime Lexington air talent Mike Graves. Fox served as music director before assuming programming duties, and the station prospered during the late 1990s.

O'Shea left the station in 1998 and Matt Jaeger took over the lead role on the morning show, continuing to dominate the Lexington adult audience. It was during this time period that the station's owner, Jacor Broadcasting, began to replace live air talent with out-of-town recorded shows from within the company. As a result, audience share began to slowly erode, and WMXL has thus never been a market leader under iHeartMedia (which, as Clear Channel Communications, absorbed Jacor in 1999). Station programming today comes from iHeartMedia's "Premium Choice" "Soft Rock" program feed.

Adult Contemporary
Barry Fox left Lexington to program WDJX in Louisville, and was replaced by T.R. Fox, who arrived from Rochester, New York. This Fox, no relation to Barry, programmed the station for several years, before giving way to the return of Dale O'Brian.  T.R. Fox oversaw the shift from Hot AC to Mainstream Adult Contemporary.

Under Program Director Dale O'Brian, WMXL was one of the first stations in the country to go with "All Christmas music" during the month of December.  In later years, the station began to start Christmas music earlier. These days, from early November until December 26 of each year, WMXL flips to a Christmas format for the holiday season, branding itself as "MixMas on Mix 94.5."

External links
Official website of Mix 94.5

References

MXL
IHeartMedia radio stations
Mainstream adult contemporary radio stations in the United States